Events in the year 2017 in Turkmenistan.

Incumbents
 President: Gurbanguly Berdimuhamedow

Events

12 February – in the Turkmenistani presidential election, 2017, president Gurbanguly Berdymukhamedov was re-elected, winning about 97% of the votes.
17-27 September – scheduled date for the 2017 Asian Indoor and Martial Arts Games, to be hosted in Ashgabat

Deaths

References

 
Years of the 21st century in Turkmenistan
Turkmenistan
Turkmenistan
2010s in Turkmenistan